Alvin A. Handrich (June 1, 1892 – November 26, 1981) was an American farmer, businessman, and politician.

Born in the town of Bloomfield, Waushara County, Wisconsin, Handrich lived in California for five years. Handrich lived on a farm in the town of Little Wolf, Wisconsin. He was district manager for Standard Oil Company until retiring in 1960 and lived in Manawa, Wisconsin. He was also secretary of the Wisconsin division of the Farm Holiday Association. Handrich served on the Little Wolf Town Board and on the Little Wolf School Board. From 1935 to 1939, Handrich served in the Wisconsin State Assembly and was elected on the Wisconsin Progressive Party ticket. Handrich served on the Manawa City Council until his death. Handrich died in a hospital in Waupaca, Wisconsin on November 26, 1981.

Notes

1892 births
1981 deaths
People from Waupaca County, Wisconsin
People from Waushara County, Wisconsin
Businesspeople from Wisconsin
Farmers from Wisconsin
Wisconsin Progressives (1924)
School board members in Wisconsin
Wisconsin city council members
Members of the Wisconsin State Assembly
20th-century American politicians
People from Manawa, Wisconsin
20th-century American businesspeople